This is a list of the main career statistics of professional Estonian tennis player Kaia Kanepi.

Performance timelines

Only main-draw results in WTA Tour, Grand Slam tournaments, Fed Cup/Billie Jean King Cup and Olympic Games are included in win–loss records.

Singles
Current through the 2023 Indian Wells Open.

Doubles

WTA career finals

Singles: 10 (4 titles, 6 runner–ups)

Doubles: 1 (runner–up)

ITF Circuit finals

Singles: 26 (20 titles, 6 runner–ups)

Doubles: 3 (2 titles, 1 runner–up)

WTA Tour career earnings
Current after the 2023 Adelaide International 1.

Career Grand Slam statistics

Seedings
The tournaments won by Kanepi are in boldface, and advanced into finals by Kanepi are in italics.

Best Grand Slam results details
Grand Slam winners are in boldface, and runner–ups are in italics.

Head-to-head records

Record against top 10 players
Kanepi's record against players who have been ranked in the top 10. Active players are in boldface.

No. 1 wins

Wins over top 10 players

Notes

References

Kanepi, Kaia